James Joseph DiCarlo (born  1967) is an American neuroscientist currently serving as the Peter de Florez Professor of Neuroscience at the Massachusetts Institute of Technology.

Biography
DiCarlo received his BS in biomedical engineering at Northwestern University in 1990. He then attended the MD PhD program at Johns Hopkins University and graduated in 1998. After spending two years as a postdoctoral researcher in primate visual neurophysiology at Baylor College of Medicine, he joined the faculty at MIT in the Brain and Cognitive Sciences Department.

References

Year of birth missing (living people)
Living people
Massachusetts Institute of Technology School of Science faculty
American neuroscientists
Johns Hopkins University alumni
Northwestern University alumni
Sloan Research Fellows